London Road (Guildford) railway station is situated in the east of Guildford in Surrey, England, lying close to the suburbs of Merrow and Burpham.

The station is managed by South Western Railway, who also provide all train services.

It is situated on the New Guildford Line between Waterloo and Guildford via Cobham, although some trains operate via Epsom rather than Cobham.

The parenthesised Guildford is to avoid confusing the station with the similarly named London Road (Brighton).  The name was formally changed to London Road, Guildford from London Road in 1923 when operation of the line was taken over from the London and South Western Railway by the Southern Railway, which then ran all the railways in South East England.

Platform layout
Platform 2 - Down trains to Guildford

Services 
All services at London Road are operated by South Western Railway using  EMUs.

The typical off-peak service in trains per hour is:
 3 tph to 

Additional services run via Epsom during the peak hours, increasing the service to 4 tph in each direction.

Accidents and incidents 
 On 4 January 2019, Lee Pomeroy, a 51-year-old male passenger, was fatally stabbed on board a South Western Railway service from Guildford to London Waterloo, as it was travelling between London Road and Clandon stations. The train, formed of a pair of Class 455 electric multiple units, was stopped at the next station along the line, Horsley, to allow emergency services to deal with the incident. Both Pomeroy and the suspect had boarded the train at London Road. The suspect in the stabbing exited the train at Clandon and was arrested the following day.  The suspect, Darren Pencille, was subsequently found guilty of murder and sentenced to life imprisonment.

References

External links 

Transport in Guildford
Railway stations in Surrey
Former London and South Western Railway stations
Railway stations in Great Britain opened in 1885
Railway stations served by South Western Railway
Buildings and structures in Guildford